London Buses route 43 is a Transport for London contracted bus route in London, England. Running between Friern Barnet and London Bridge station, it is operated by Metroline.

History

Route 43 commenced operating in August 1912 as a daily route between Archway station and London Bridge station via Holloway Road, Upper Street, Angel, City Road, Moorgate, Bank station and London Bridge, and was quickly extended to Muswell Hill Broadway via East Finchley and Fortis Green Road.

The route along which the 43 operates was designated as London's first Red Route bus priority scheme in 1992. In late 1999 the route became one of the first in London to be operated by low-floor double-deck buses, when new Plaxton President bodied Dennis Trident 2s were introduced.

In July 2019, Alexander Dennis Enviro400EV battery electric buses entered service on the route, making it the first route served solely by zero emission double-decker buses.

In 2021, the frequency of the service was reduced from 9 buses per hour to 7.5 during Monday-Friday peak times, and from 8 buses per hour to 7.5 during Monday-Saturday daytimes.

Variants
In 1992 a peak hour route X43 was introduced to supplement route 43 in connection with the Red Route bus priority scheme introduced at the time. It used specially liveried Scania N113 double-deckers branded as Red Express. London Northern, the subsidiary of London Buses which had taken over operation of the route in 1989, stated that passenger numbers along the route increased by 8,700 in the year following its introduction.

In popular culture
An Alexander Dennis Enviro400 operating on route 43 was used in the 2007 film The Bourne Ultimatum.

Route 43 is mentioned in the song Bros by North London alternative rock band Wolf Alice. A route 43 bus is shown at the very end of the music video for the song.

Current route
Route 43 operates via these primary locations:
Friern Barnet Library
Muswell Hill Broadway
Highgate Wood
Highgate station 
Archway station  
Upper Holloway station 
Holloway Road station 
St Mary Magdalene Church
Highbury & Islington station   
Islington Town Hall
St Mary's Church
Angel station 
Moorfields Eye Hospital
Old Street station  
Finsbury Square
Moorgate station    
Bank station  
Monument station 
London Bridge bus station  for London Bridge station

References

External links

Bus routes in London
Transport in the London Borough of Barnet
Transport in the London Borough of Hackney
Transport in the London Borough of Haringey
Transport in the London Borough of Islington
Transport in the London Borough of Southwark
Transport in the City of London